Matthias Vanden Borre (born 14 May 1984) is a Belgian lawyer and politician for the New Flemish Alliance.

Borre was born in Dundee, Scotland. He studied political science at KU Leuven and a master's degree in law at Ghent University. He then worked as a lawyer and an assistant to former N-VA leader Geert Bourgeois. Since 2018, he has been a municipal councilor in Brussels. In 2019, he was elected to the Parliament of the Brussels-Capital Region on second place on the N-VA's list.

In April 2021, Borre was assaulted by a gang while out walking in Brussels which left him with physical injuries.

References 

1984 births
Living people
New Flemish Alliance politicians
21st-century Belgian politicians
Members of the Parliament of the Brussels-Capital Region